Eternal Darkness is the debut EP of Battery, released in 1991 by COP International.

Music
Founding members Shawn Brice and Evan Sornstein met at Bennington College in Vermont in 1989. Both were influenced by electronic music, with Sornstein having grown up listening to Wendy Carlos (formerly Walter Carlos), Kraftwerk, Klaus Schultze and Isao Tomita. After composing as a duo they decided to recruit fellow student Stuart Scanlon to fill membership and earn extra credit and money - the college paid bands a hundred dollars to perform for a live audience. When asked why the name Battery appealed to its members, they replied: "According to any standard American dictionary it signifies: a percussion section of an orchestra, the artillery section of an army, cells where energy is stored, the dock/loading industrial section of a major city, and on and on."

After the members of Battery graduated and Scanlon parted ways with the band Brice and Sornstein met Christian Petke of Deathline International, who decided to launch COP International with Battery and Diatribe as its lead bands. In 1992 the title track appeared on the California Cyber Crash Compilation, one of the first releases by COP Intl, and "Never Forget" was provided to Zoth Ommog Records for Body Rapture II.

Reception
Industrial Reviews gave Eternal Darkness four stars out of five and praised the thoughtfulness, energy and charm across the EP's four compositions, especially on the lead and coda tracks.

Track listing

Personnel
Adapted from the Eternal Darkness liner notes.

Battery
 Shawn Brice – instruments, production, engineering
 Stuart Scanlon – instruments, production, engineering
 Evan Sornstein (Curium Design) – instruments, production, engineering, cover art

Production and design
 Christa Brüggemann (as SST) – mastering
 Pain Less – assistant production
 Christian Petke (as Count Zero) – assistant production

Release history

References

External links 
 

1991 debut EPs
Battery (electro-industrial band) albums
COP International EPs